The Crvena Zvezda–Partizan basketball rivalry, commonly referred as the Eternal derby, is an Adriatic League, Serbian League, and Belgrade-based rivalry between Crvena zvezda and Partizan. These two men's basketball clubs are the biggest and most popular clubs in Serbia. The two clubs both play their home games at Aleksandar Nikolić Hall or Štark Arena in Belgrade. The rivalry started immediately after the creation of the two clubs in 1945 and the two clubs have been dominant in domestic basketball since then. It is present in a number of different sports but the most intense matches are in football sections of both clubs.

The two clubs have won the two highest numbers of national titles in Serbia: Crvena zvezda won 22, one more than Partizan. Together, they account for 17 of the 48 national titles in Yugoslavia (1945–1992), 11 of 14 national titles in Serbia and Montenegro (1992–2006), and all national titles in Serbia (2006 onwards). Also, the two clubs have won the two highest numbers of championships in the Adriatic League. Together, they account for 12 of 20 championships. Crvena Zvezda is the defending ABA champion in the upcoming season.

In European competitions, Crvena zvezda won a FIBA Saporta Cup (then known as European Cup Winner's Cup) in 1974, while Partizan was the European champion in 1992 and won 3 FIBA Korać Cups.

Aleksandar Nikolić and Zoran Slavnić are the only individuals who have played and coached both Crvena zvezda and Partizan in their careers.

History

1946–1992: Yugoslavia 

The first official game between Crvena zvezda and Partizan was held on 6 September 1946 in Belgrade. Partizan won with a 24–21 score.

1992–2006: Serbia and Montenegro

2004 onward: Adriatic League

2006 onward: Serbia 

Two clubs, Crvena Zvezda and Partizan, won all national titles in the Serbian league since its inaugural season in 2006. Partizan won the first eight titles, until the 2013–14 season, while Crvena Zvezda won the next seven seasons, concluding with the 2021–22 season.

Home arenas 

The two clubs both play their home games in Belgrade, at the Aleksandar Nikolić Hall or the Belgrade Arena, while Partizan also play their home games at the Ranko Žeravica Sports Hall.

Aleksandar Nikolić Hall
The Aleksandar Nikolić Hall, formerly known as Pionir Hall, is an indoor arena located in the Belgrade's municipality Palilula. The arena was built in 1973 in eleven months, by Energoprojekt. It has a seating capacity of 8,000, following an expansion and renovation in 2019. It was renamed in 2016 in honour of Basketball Hall of Famer Aleksandar Nikolić who played for and coached both clubs. Crvena zvezda play their home games in Serbian, Adriatic, and European competitions. On the other hand, Partizan occasionally play their home games only in domestic competitions.

Štark Arena
The Štark Arena, also known as Belgrade Arena, is an indoor arena located in the Belgrade's municipality New Belgrade. The arena was finished and opened in 2004. It has a seating capacity of 18,386, but the current record stands at 24,232, which was set in 2014, Partizan occasionally play their home games in EuroLeague, while Partizan play there in Adriatic and European competitions.

Ranko Žeravica Hall
The Ranko Žeravica Sports Hall is an indoor arena located in the Belgrade's municipality New Belgrade, as well.  The arena was finished and opened in 1968. It has a seating capacity of 5,000. Partizan only uses the arena for their home games in domestic competitions. Formerly known as New Belgrade Hall, it was renamed in 2016 in honour of basketball coach Ranko Žeravica.

Head-to-head

Recent matches 
The following are the matches between Crvena zvezda and Partizan in the current season:

Matches in Adriatic competitions
The following are the matches between Crvena Zvezda and Partizan in the Adriatic competitions:

Matches in Serbian competitions
The following are the matches between Crvena Zvezda and Partizan in the Serbian top-tier competitions:

Matches in European competitions
The following are the matches between Crvena Zvezda and Partizan in the European competitions:

Matches in defunct competitions

1946–1992: Yugoslavia 
The following were the matches between Crvena Zvezda and Partizan in the Yugoslav competitions:

1992–2006: Serbia and Montenegro 
The following were the matches between Crvena Zvezda and Partizan in the Yugoslav/Serb–Montenegrin competitions:

Statistics
Note: Last updated on

Common individuals

Players 
The following players have played for both Crvena zvezda and Partizan in their careers:

 Strahinja Alagić – Partizan (1946); Crvena zvezda (1947–1951)
 Aleksandar Aranitović – Crvena zvezda (2016–2017); Partizan (2017–2019)
 Darko Balaban – Partizan (2007–2010); Crvena zvezda (2010–2011)
 Boris Bakić – Partizan (2004–2007); Crvena zvezda (2007–2011)
 Milan Blagojević – Crvena zvezda (1947–1948); Partizan (1950–1956)
 Luka Bogdanović – Crvena zvezda (2002–2004); Partizan (2004–2007, 2014–2015)
 Nebojša Bukumirović – Partizan (1980–1984); Crvena zvezda (1990–1991)
 Aleksandar Cvetković – Crvena zvezda (2010–2013); Partizan (2015–2016)
 Goran Ćakić – Crvena zvezda (2002–2003); Partizan (2003–2004)
 Borislav Ćurčić – Crvena zvezda (1950–1955); Partizan (1958–1965)
 Dražen Dalipagić – Partizan (1971–1980; 1981–1982); Crvena zvezda (1990–1991)
 Nemanja Dangubić – Crvena zvezda (2014–2018); Partizan (2020–2022)
 Vlade Divac – Partizan (1986–1989); Crvena zvezda (1999)
 Milan Dozet – Partizan (1996–1998); Crvena zvezda (2001–2004)
 Strahinja Dragićević – Partizan (2006); Crvena zvezda (2009–2011)
 Vladimir Đokić – Partizan (1997–2000); Crvena zvezda (2000–2001)
 Aleksandar Gajić – Partizan (2000–2002); Crvena zvezda (2002–2003)
 Aleksandar Gilić – Crvena zvezda (1988–1990, 1993–1996); Partizan (1998–1999)
 James Gist – Partizan (2010–2011); Crvena zvezda (2019–2020)
 Milan Gurović – Partizan (2004); Crvena zvezda (2005–2007)
 Stefan Janković – Crvena zvezda (2017–2018); Partizan (2018–2019, 2020–2021)
 Ljubiša Janjić – Crvena zvezda (1965); Partizan (1967–1968)
 Nemanja Jelesijević – Partizan (1999–2000); Crvena zvezda (2004–2005)
 Slavoljub Jovanović – Crvena zvezda (N/A); Partizan (N/A)
 Raško Katić – Crvena zvezda (2004–2005, 2012–2014); Partizan (2010–2012)
 Tarence Kinsey – Partizan (2013–2014); Crvena zvezda (2016)
 Đorđe Konjović – Crvena zvezda (1953–1957); Partizan (1958)
 Mirko Kovač – Partizan (2000–2001, 2003–2005); Crvena zvezda (2006–2009)
 Đorđe Lazić – Crvena zvezda (1947–1948); Partizan (1951–1957)
 Marko Lekić – Partizan (2002–2003); Crvena zvezda (2008)
 Mathias Lessort – Crvena zvezda (2017–2018); Partizan (2021–present)
 Sava Lešić – Partizan (2009–2010); Crvena zvezda (2010–2012)

 Dragan Lukovski – Partizan (1995–1999); Crvena zvezda (1999–2000)
 Ivan Marinković – Crvena zvezda (2010–2011); Partizan (2011–2012)
 Zoran Marković – Crvena zvezda (1964–1966); Partizan (1969–1970, 1973–1974)
 Stevan Milošević – Crvena zvezda (2008); Partizan (2010)
 Strahinja Milošević – Partizan (2007–2010); Crvena zvezda (2010–2011)
 Andreja Milutinović – Crvena zvezda (2011–2013); Partizan (2014–2016)
 Aleksandar Nikolić – Partizan (1946–1947); Crvena zvezda (1947–1949)
 Igor Perović – Partizan (1991–1993); Crvena zvezda (1996–1998)
 Oliver Popović – Partizan (1986–1991); Crvena zvezda (1997–1999)
 Kevin Punter – Crvena zvezda (2019–2020); Partizan (2021–present)
 Ivan Radenović – Partizan (2002–2003); Crvena zvezda (2013–2014)
 Milan Radivojević – Crvena zvezda (1953–1954); Partizan (1955–1958)
 Branko Radović – Partizan (1954–1957); Crvena zvezda (1957–1960)
 Miroslav Raduljica – Partizan (2011–2012); Crvena zvezda (2022–present)
 Lawrence Roberts – Crvena zvezda (2008–2009); Partizan (2009–2010)
 Predrag Samardžiski – Partizan (2004–2005); Crvena zvezda (2013)
 Goran Savanović – Crvena zvezda (2000–2001); Partizan (2004–2005)
 Zoran Slavnić – Crvena zvezda (1967–1977); Partizan (1981–1982)
 Zoran Sretenović – Crvena zvezda (1985–1986, 1995–1996); Partizan (1993–1994)
 Borislav Stanković – Crvena zvezda (1946–1948); Partizan (1950–1953)
 Jovo Stanojević – Crvena zvezda (1996–2000); Partizan (2001–2002)
 Radomir Šaper – Crvena zvezda (1945); Partizan (1946–1953)
 Mlađan Šilobad – Crvena zvezda (1989–1991, 2002–2003); Partizan (1991–1995, 2003–2004)
 Mlađen Šljivančanin – Partizan (2002–2003); Crvena zvezda (2007–2008)
 Slobodan Šljivančanin – Partizan (1990–1991); Crvena zvezda (2000)
 Dejan Tomašević – Crvena zvezda (1990–1995); Partizan (1995–1999)
 Dragoljub Vidačić – Crvena zvezda (1992–1995, 1998–1999); Partizan (1995–1997)
 Čedomir Vitkovac – Crvena zvezda (2003–2006); Partizan (2007–2009, 2015–2016)
 Slavko Vraneš – Crvena zvezda (2004); Partizan (2007–2010)
 Miloš Vujanić – Crvena zvezda (1999–2001); Partizan (2001–2003)
 Corey Walden – Partizan (2019–2020); Crvena zvezda (2020–2021)

The following players have played for one club in youth system career and for rival club in senior (professional) career:

 Petar Aranitović – Crvena zvezda (youth system), Partizan (senior team)
 Nemanja Bjelica – Partizan (youth system), Crvena zvezda (senior team)
 Aleksandar Đorđević – Crvena zvezda (youth system), Partizan (senior team)
 Đorđe Gagić – Crvena zvezda (youth system), Partizan (senior team)
 Marko Gudurić – Partizan (youth system), Crvena zvezda (youth system and senior team)
 Nikola Janković – Crvena zvezda (youth system), Partizan (senior team)
 Stevan Jelovac – Partizan (youth system), Crvena zvezda (senior team)
 Nikola Jovanović – Partizan (youth system), Crvena zvezda (youth system and senior team)
 Dejan Koturović – Crvena zvezda (youth system), Partizan (senior team)
 Đorđe Majstorović – Crvena zvezda (youth system), Partizan (youth system and senior team)

 Vladimir Micov – Crvena zvezda (youth system), Partizan (senior team)
 Miloš Mirković – Partizan (youth system), Crvena zvezda (senior team)
 Filip Petrušev – Partizan (youth system), Crvena zvezda (youth system and senior team)
 Milan Preković – Partizan (youth system), Crvena zvezda (senior team)
 Nikola Radičević – Partizan (youth system), Crvena zvezda (senior team)
 Vuk Radivojević – Partizan (youth system), Crvena zvezda (senior team)
 Vladimir Radmanović – Partizan (youth system), Crvena zvezda (youth system and senior team)
 Stefan Stojačić – Partizan (youth system), Crvena zvezda (senior team)
 Nenad Trunić – Partizan (youth system), Crvena zvezda (senior team)

The following players have played for both Crvena zvezda and Partizan in their youth system careers:
 Nemanja Kapetanović – Partizan than Crvena zvezda
 Stevan Karapandžić – Partizan than Crvena zvezda

Coaches 
The following head coaches have coached both Crvena zvezda and Partizan in their careers:
 Borislav Džaković – Partizan (1982–1984, 1994–1995); Crvena zvezda (1995–1996, 1998)
 Milivoje Lazić – Crvena zvezda (2012); Partizan (2020) 
 Vladislav Lučić – Partizan (1985–1986, 1998–1999); Crvena zvezda (1992–1994, 1997–1998, 1999–2000)
 Aleksandar Nikolić – Partizan (1959–1960); Crvena zvezda (1971–1974)
 Miroslav Nikolić – Partizan (1996–1998; 2017); Crvena zvezda (2001, 2002)
 Zoran Slavnić – Partizan (1984–1985); Crvena zvezda (1988–1991, 1994–1995)
 Duško Vujošević – Partizan (1986–1989, 1990–1991, 2001–2010, 2012–2015); Crvena zvezda (1991–1992)
 Ranko Žeravica – Partizan (1971–1974, 1976–1978, 1995–1996); Crvena zvezda (1980–1986, 1996–1997)

The following assistant coaches have coached both Crvena zvezda and Partizan in their careers:
 Predrag Jaćimović – Partizan (1999–2000); Crvena zvezda (2003)
 Bogdan Karaičić – Crvena zvezda (2020); Partizan (2021–present)
 Milivoje Karalejić – Partizan (1992–1994, 1998–1999); Crvena zvezda (2008–2009)
 Milivoje Lazić – Partizan (2010–2011); Crvena zvezda (2011–2012)
 Veselin Matić – Crvena zvezda (1993–1994); Partizan (1994–1996)
 Saša Nikitović – Partizan (2004–2005); Crvena zvezda (2005–2008)
 Vladan Radonjić – Partizan (2008–2010, 2011–2012, 2020–2021); Crvena zvezda (2022–present)
 Marin Sedlaček – Crvena zvezda (1988–1991, 1992–1993); Partizan (1999)
 Dejan Srzić – Partizan (1989–1990); Crvena zvezda (1990–1992)
 Petronije Zimonjić – Crvena zvezda (1992–1994, 2010–2011); Partizan (2000–2006)
 Predrag Zimonjić – Crvena zvezda (2002–2003); Partizan (2021–present)

The following youth coaches have coached both Crvena zvezda and Partizan in their careers:
 Vladimir Bošnjak – Partizan (1987–1990); Crvena zvezda (1997–1998)
 Saša Jakovljević – Crvena zvezda (N/A); Partizan (N/A)
 Aleksandar Lukman – Partizan (1995–1996); Crvena zvezda (N/A)

Others 
The following individuals have also played and/or coached both Crvena zvezda and Partizan in their careers:
 Strahinja Alagić – Partizan (1946 player), Crvena zvezda (1947–1951 player; 1976 coach)
 Jovica Antonić – Partizan (1982–1983 player), Crvena zvezda (1998–1999 coach)
 Borislav Ćurčić – Crvena zvezda (1950–1955 player), Partizan (1958–1965 player; 1965–1967 coach)
 Zoran Krečković – Partizan (1977–1978 player), Crvena zvezda (2001–2002 coach)
 Svetislav Pešić – Partizan (1967–1971 player), Crvena zvezda (2008–2009, 2011–2012 coach)
 Borislav Stanković – Crvena zvezda (1946–1948 player), Partizan (1950–1953 player–coach)
 Miodrag Stefanović – Crvena zvezda (1946 player), Partizan (1953 coach)

Records

Top scorers 
The following players recorded more than or equal to 40 points in a game between Crvena zvezda and Partizan.

Honours
The rivalry reflected in Eternal derby matches comes about as Crvena zvezda and Partizan are the most successful basketball clubs in Serbia.

See also 
 Budućnost–Crvena Zvezda basketball rivalry
 List of sports rivalries

Notes

References

External links
 
 

Basketball rivalries
KK Crvena Zvezda
KK Partizan
Sports competitions in Belgrade